Alexander Brown Mackie (May 1, 1894 – June 5, 1966) was an American football and basketball, coach, college athletics administrator, professor, and college founder and president. He served as the head football coach at Kansas Wesleyan University in Salina, Kansas from 1921 to 1937, compiling a record of 79–52–13. He was also the head basketball coach at Kansas Wesleyan from 1921 to 1938, tallying a mark of 113–161. Mackie was the co-founder of Brown Mackie College, also in Salina, for which he served as president from 1938 until his retirement in 1963.

Early life and education
Mackie was born on May 1, 1894, in Gazaam in Clearfield County, Pennsylvania. He graduated from Dickinson Seminary in Williamsport, Pennsylvania and Ohio Wesleyan University in Delaware, Ohio. Mackie played football for Dickinson Seminary in 1913.

Mackie served in the United States Navy as an ensign during World War I.

Coaching career
Mackie coached athletics at Athens High School in The Plains, Ohio for two years before he was hired to head the athletic department at Kansas Wesleyan University of Salina, Kansas in 1921. He was the ninth head football coach for Kansas Wesleyan University in Salina, Kansas, serving for 17 seasons, from 1921 to 1937, compiling a record of 79–52–13.

Mackie's 1922 team was considered having "no great strengths" by football legend Walter Camp. As he spent more time with the program, his teams encountered more success. Mackie's teams won the Kansas Collegiate Athletic Conference championship five times during his tenure. In 1931, his team was one of the few undefeated teams in the country.

Academic contributions
Mackie was the co-founder of Brown Mackie College in Salina, Kansas. He and Perry E. Brown founded the school as a business college, taking what was a part of Kansas Wesleyan's school of business.

Head coaching record

References

External links
 

1894 births
1966 deaths
Heads of universities and colleges in the United States
Kansas Wesleyan Coyotes athletic directors
Kansas Wesleyan Coyotes football coaches
Kansas Wesleyan Coyotes men's basketball coaches
Lycoming Warriors football players
Ohio Wesleyan University alumni
United States Navy personnel of World War I
United States Navy officers
People from Clearfield County, Pennsylvania
Coaches of American football from Pennsylvania
Basketball coaches from Pennsylvania
Military personnel from Pennsylvania
20th-century American academics